Neenade Naa (English: For Yourself, Right?) is a 2014 Indian Kannada romantic comedy film directed and written by "Kadhal" Kandhas who earlier worked as a choreographer for South Indian films. The film stars Prajwal Devaraj, Priyanka Kandwal and Ankitha in the lead roles. The film marks the first productional venture of Devaraj's home production, "Dynamic Visions". The film released on 17 October 2014 and positive response from critics

Plot
Dev (Prajwal Devaraj), who is an assistant director, is confused about his career and love life. He has a best friend called pavi, with whom he falls in love with. He drops her to office, temple, sings songs with her, watches movies and so on. But when the girl mistakes it is not just friendship but love, she dumps him and asks him to move on. Then the flashback that they were married by family pressure and now are divorced. Finally pavi realizes that dev always saw her as a friend and had no bad intentions.
Pavi apologies to dev and with his help she achieves her dreams. In climax Pavi thanks dev for his supports and moves abroad. Dev confesses his love for lacchu who loved him from a long time.

Cast
 Prajwal Devaraj as Dev
 Priyanka Kandwal as Pavi, Dev's ex-wife
 Ankitha as Ankitha, Dev's love interest
 Doddanna
 Avinash
 Pavitra Lokesh
 Bullet Prakash
Pannaga Bharana

Development
Based on true story..Its director's own life story..The title of the film is inspired by a popular song in the Prajwal's earlier starrer Murali Meets Meera. The film features Prajwal's character in four different looks from a school going boy to a grown-up youth and he had to shed around 14 kilos weight for portraying the role.

Soundtrack

Arjun Janya has composed a total of 5 songs written by various lyricists.

References

External links

 Twitter account
 Neenade Naa Press Meet

2014 films
2010s Kannada-language films
2014 romantic comedy films
Indian romantic comedy films
Films shot in Bangalore
Films set in Bangalore
Films scored by Arjun Janya